Carex limosa is a species of sedge known as bog-sedge, mud sedge, and shore sedge.

Distribution 
This sedge is an aquatic or shore plant which can most often be found in peat bogs in mountains. It is widely distributed across North America and northern Eurasia.

Description 
Carex limosa has a large rhizome and hairy roots. It produces a stem which is generally just under half a meter in height and has a few basal leaves which are long and threadlike. The tip of the stem is often occupied by a staminate spikelet, and below this hang one or more nodding pistillate spikelets. Some spikelets may have both male and female parts, however. Each fruit is a few millimeters long and spade-shaped.

References

External links 
Jepson Manual Treatment - Carex limosa
Carex limosa - Photo gallery on Calphotos

limosa
Aquatic plants
Flora of North America
Flora of Europe
Flora of Asia
Plants described in 1753
Taxa named by Carl Linnaeus